The Surveyor General of India is the Head of Department of Survey of India, A department under the Ministry of Science and Technology of Government of India. The Surveyor General is also the most senior member of the Survey of India Service, an organised engineering service under the Union of India.

The current Surveyor General is Naveen Tomar.

Surveyors General
The East India Company appointed James Rennell to survey the Bengal Presidency in 1767. Lord Clive appointed him as Surveyor General. Colin Mackenzie was appointed Surveyor General of Madras Presidency in 1810, but these posts were abolished in 1815 and Mackenzie was made the first Surveyor General of India.
A list of Surveyor Generals and their tenure:

 Shri Sunil Kumar Joint Secretary, DST has taken over the charge of Surveyor General of India w.e.f 13-01-2022(F/N).

See also
 Superintending Surveyor
 Trigonometrical Survey of India

References

Further reading
 
 
 Volume I, 18th century; Volume II, 1800 to 1815; Volume III, 1815 to 1830;  Volume IV, 1830 to 1843;  Volume V, 1844 to 1861

External links 
 Official list of Surveyors General

Surveyors General of India
Indian surveyors
Civil Services of India